The St. Gabriel Cathedral is a religious building that serves as a cathedral of the Catholic Church's Apostolic Vicariate of Rodrigues and is located in the town of St. Gabriel (Saint Gabriel) on the island of Rodrigues the third smallest of the Mascarene archipelago geographically part of the African island country of Mauritius.

It is the seat of the bishop of the Apostolic Vicariate of Rodrigues (Latin: Vicariatus Apostolicus Rodrigensis). Its construction began on October 18, 1936, and was completed on 10 December 1939 when the country was under British colonial rule.

See also
Roman Catholicism in Mauritius
St. Gabriel

References

Catholic Church in Mauritius
Buildings and structures in Rodrigues
Roman Catholic cathedrals in Mauritius
Rodrigues
Roman Catholic churches completed in 1939
20th-century Roman Catholic church buildings